Nacoleia charesalis is a moth in the family Crambidae. It was described by Francis Walker in 1859. It is found in Australia, India, Sri Lanka, Borneo, Sumbawa, the Philippines, Singapore, Thailand, Japan, Taiwan and on the Seychelles (Mahé, Félicité).

The larvae have been recorded feeding on Shorea leprosula, Shorea macroptera and Shorea parvifolia.

References

Moths described in 1859
Nacoleia
Moths of Asia
Moths of Australia